The Moaning of Life is a British travel documentary comedy television series broadcast on Sky 1. It follows Karl Pilkington around the world as he visits other cultures. Unlike An Idiot Abroad, which had a similar premise, The Moaning of Life sees Pilkington actually choosing to visit other countries in order to see how they face up to some of life's biggest issues with their cultures and customs. He also reassesses his life now that he has reached the age of 40, which he considers to be "middle age". The series has eleven one-hour episodes, and sees Pilkington visiting Ghana, India, Indonesia, Japan, Mexico, the Philippines, South Africa, Taiwan, and the United States. Its original broadcast run in the United Kingdom began on 20 October 2013.

Sky1 postponed the fifth and final episode of the first season – "Death", which sees Pilkington in the Philippines contemplating death with locals – after Typhoon Haiyan struck the Philippines in early November 2013. Originally scheduled for 17 November 2013, it was not broadcast until 17 December 2013.

The series was released in the United Kingdom on DVD and Blu-ray on 18 November 2013.

Discovery Communications' Science began broadcasting The Moaning of Life in North America on 18 January 2014. The series aired in Australia from 17 February 2015 on BBC Knowledge.

A six-part second and final series was commissioned and premiered on 13 October 2015.

Series overview

Episodes

Series 1 (2013)

North American broadcasts
In North America, Science premiered the episodes in a different order, as follows:

 Episode 2, "Happiness", 18 January 2014, 10:00 p.m. EST
 Episode 3, "Kids", 18 January 2014, 11:00 p.m. EST
 Episode 1, "Marriage", 25 January 2014, 10:00 p.m. EST
 Episode 4, "Vocation & Money", 6 February 2014, 7:00 p.m. EST
 Episode 5, "Death", 6 February 2014, 8:00 p.m. EST

"Vocation & Money" and "Death" originally were scheduled to air at 10:00 p.m. EST on 1 February and 8 February 2014, respectively, but both were rescheduled to 6 February 2014.

At about three-quarters of the way through each North American broadcast, Science aired a brief "never-before-seen clip" from The Moaning of Life featuring Pilkington commenting on an issue during filming of the episode.

Series 2 (2015)

Home media
Despite the final episode having not yet aired in the United Kingdom due to its postponement, the entire first series was released on DVD and Blu-ray on 18 November 2013. The series was also made available on Amazon.com. An advertisement featuring Pilkington complaining about Amazon.com was released on YouTube to promote the series.

The second series titled The Moaning of Life 2 was released onto DVD and Blu-ray on 23 November 2015.  A boxset featuring both series was also released on 23 November 2015 on DVD and Blu-ray.

Books
 The Moaning of Life: The Worldly Wisdom of Karl Pilkington (Canongate, 2013) 
 More Moaning: The Enlightened One Returns (Canongate, 2016)

References

External links
 
 

2013 British television series debuts
2015 British television series endings
2010s British comedy television series
2010s British documentary television series
2010s British travel television series
English-language television shows
Sky UK original programming